Daniel McKellar (1892 – 13 April 1918) was a Scottish professional footballer who played as a forward in the Scottish League for Kilmarnock and Airdrieonians.

Personal life 
McKellar served as a private in the Highland Light Infantry during the First World War and was killed in action in West Flanders on 13 April 1918. He is commemorated on the Ploegsteert Memorial.

Career statistics

References 

Scottish footballers
1917 deaths
British Army personnel of World War I
British military personnel killed in World War I
1892 births
Highland Light Infantry soldiers
Scottish Football League players
Ashfield F.C. players
Footballers from Glasgow
Bellshill Athletic F.C. players
Airdrieonians F.C. (1878) players
Kilmarnock F.C. players
Association football forwards
Scottish Junior Football Association players